Manuel Godínez (born 1921) is a Cuban former Negro league pitcher who played in the 1940s.

A native of Cuba, Godínez made his Negro leagues debut in 1946 with the Indianapolis Clowns. He played three seasons with Indianapolis, and went on to play for the Brandon Grays of the Mandak League in 1950.

References

External links
 and Seamheads

1921 births
Indianapolis Clowns players
Cuban baseball players
Baseball pitchers
Brandon Greys players
Cuban expatriates in the United States
Possibly living people